The Embassy in the Building is a 2005 Egyptian comedy film directed by Amr Arafa.

Cast 
 Adel Emam - Sherif Khairy
 Dalia El Behery - Dalia
 Ahmed Rateb - Rateb
 Ahmed Siam - 
 Lotfy Labib - David Cohen, the Israeli Ambassador
 Said Tarabeek - Hussian
 khaled ali - Hussian

External links 

2005 comedy films
2005 films
Egyptian comedy films
2000s Arabic-language films